Voxeo Corporation was a technology company that specialized in providing development platforms for unified customer experience (self-service) and unified communications (real time communications) applications. Voxeo was headquartered in Orlando, Florida with main offices in Cologne, Germany; Beijing, China; London, UK and San Francisco, US.

Customers have developed a wide range of applications on Voxeo's platform, ranging from traditional customer service IVR systems to conferencing systems to outbound notification systems.  As of September 2011, the company reported that over 220,000 developers have joined Voxeo's developer programs.

In 2013, Voxeo was acquired by Aspect Software.

History
Voxeo was founded by Jonathan Taylor and others in 1999 with the goal of making it easy for web developers to create telephony applications.  In 2000 and 2001, the company received around $40 million in investments from Crosspoint Venture Partners, the Mayfield Fund, and others. In September 2004, an employee- and management-led buyout of the investment firms moved the company into being an employee-owned private company. Voxeo was acquired in 2013 by Aspect Software.

Voxeo has grown its services through both internal development and acquisition. In October 2005, Voxeo acquired the VoiceXML IVR platform and customers of Vocomo. In May 2006, Voxeo launched a European subsidiary, and followed that in July 2006 with the acquisition of VoiceReady, which provided Voxeo with their Designer graphical tool. In August 2008, Voxeo acquired Micromethod Technologies of Beijing China, gaining a presence in Asia, and also SIP Servlet technology.

In December 2008, Voxeo announced the acquisition of VoiceObjects of Cologne, Germany, adding a rich application development tool to Voxeo's portfolio. Those acquisitions were followed by hosted IM application provider IMiifed in May 2009, open source telephony framework Adhearsion in July 2009, Motorola's VoiceXML browser business in October 2009, and web collaboration platform Clackpoint in January 2010. Voxeo acquired cloud communications platform Teleku in August 2010 and application provider WebForPhone in November 2010.

In July 2013, the company spun off its Voxeo Labs and the Tropo product to form Tropo, Inc. Tropo got acquired by Cisco in 2015.

Over the years, Voxeo has received industry recognition, recently including placement in Gartner's Magic Quadrant for IVR in 2008, listing as one of only two "shortlist" vendors by analyst firm Datamonitor in 2009, and receiving the highest rating of "Strong Positive" in Gartner's 2011 Marketscope for IVR Systems and Enterprise Voice Portals.

Competitors include Tellme Networks, West Corporation, Genesys, Avaya, and others.

Products 
Voxeo's products are all available as SaaS / Platform as a service (public cloud), on-premises software (private cloud), or hybrid clouds that combine the public-cloud and on-premises components.  Voxeo products include:
 Prophecy Interactive Voice Response (IVR) platform
 VoiceObjects multi-channel (IVR, SMS, IM, web, social) service creation environment - rebranded to CXP in 2013
 PRISM SIP/HTTP/XMPP Java application server and media server (previously SIPmethod)
 Tropo multi-lingual cloud-based communications platform for voice, SMS, IM and Twitter
 IMified hosted instant messaging application development and deployment platform
 SMSified hosted SMS (text messaging) application development and deployment platform
 Phono web-based softphone and collaboration SDK

Services
Voxeo provides the Prophecy application platform for premises deployment or via its global hosted infrastructure.  The company began initially providing hosted/SaaS services in 2000, and then, offered a premises platform in 2006.  In March 2009, Voxeo launched the Tropo.com platform that allows developers to create voice/telephony applications using the languages of Ruby, Python, PHP, Groovy, and Javascript or via a WebAPI that utilizes a request-response model and talks to an application running on a web server using HTTP and JSON.  In May 2011, Voxeo launched SMSified, a new service for developers wanting to build inbound and outbound SMS/text messaging applications.

The Voxeo platform is based on open standards like VoiceXML, CCXML, and SIP, and the company puts a strong emphasis on standards.  Former Voxeo employee Dan Burnett chaired the W3C Voice Browser Working Group and was Co-Editor-In-Chief of VoiceXML 3.  Former Voxeo CTO RJ Auburn, now with Sighthound, Inc., chaired the W3C CCXML working group.

See also
 List of speech recognition software
 Speech recognition
 IVR
 Telemarketing
 SaaS

References

External links
Voxeo developer portal

Telecommunications companies of the United States
Telecommunications companies established in 1999
Companies based in Orlando, Florida
Cloud communication platforms
2013 mergers and acquisitions
1999 establishments in Florida